Holmesina is a genus of pampathere, an extinct group of armadillo-like creatures that were distantly related to extant armadillos. Like armadillos, and unlike the other extinct branch of megafaunal cingulates, the glyptodonts, the shell was made up of flexible plates which allowed the animal to move more easily. Holmesina species were herbivores that grazed on coarse vegetation; armadillos are mostly insectivorous or omnivorous.

Distribution 
They traveled north during the faunal interchange, and adapted well to North America, like the ground sloths, glyptodonts, armadillos, capybaras, and other South American immigrants. Their fossils are found from Brazil to the United States, mostly in Texas and Florida.

References

Further reading 
 J. C. Cisneros. 2005. New Pleistocene vertebrate fauna from El Salvador. Revista Brasileira de Paleontologia 8(3):239-255
 P. J. Gaudioso, G. M. Gasparini, and R. M. Barquez. 2016. Paleofauna del Pleistoceno de Termas de Rio Hondo, Santiago del Estero, Argentina. Ameghiniana 53(6):54-54
 J. I. Mead, S. L. Swift, R. S. White, H. G. McDonald, and A. Baez. 2007. Late Pleistocene (Rancholabrean) glyptodont and pampathere (Xenarthra, Cingulata) from Sonora, Mexico. Revista Mexicana de Ciencias Geológicas 24(3):439-449

Prehistoric cingulates
Pleistocene xenarthrans
Prehistoric placental genera
Pleistocene mammals of North America
Blancan
Rancholabrean
Pleistocene Costa Rica
Fossils of Costa Rica
Pleistocene El Salvador
Fossils of El Salvador
Pleistocene Mexico
Fossils of Mexico
Pleistocene United States
Pleistocene mammals of South America
Lujanian
Ensenadan
Uquian
Pleistocene Argentina
Fossils of Argentina
Pleistocene Brazil
Fossils of Brazil
Pleistocene Ecuador
Fossils of Ecuador
Pleistocene Peru
Fossils of Peru
Pleistocene Venezuela
Fossils of Venezuela
Fossil taxa described in 1930
Taxa named by George Gaylord Simpson